The Sweet Escape (French title: Comme un avion) is a 2015 French comedy film written, directed by and starring Bruno Podalydès. The film also stars Sandrine Kiberlain, Agnès Jaoui and Vimala Pons.

Premise 
A fifty-something graphics artist has always dreamed of flying an airmail plane. One day he assembles a kayak which he thinks looks like fuselage, and set off on a trip to unexpected encounters.

Cast 
 Bruno Podalydès as Michel
 Sandrine Kiberlain as Rachelle
 Agnès Jaoui as Laëtitia 
 Vimala Pons as Mila
 Denis Podalydès as Rémi
 Michel Vuillermoz as Christophe
 Noémie Lvovsky as Madame Pirchtate
 Benjamin Lavernhe as Bernard
 Jean-Noël Brouté as Damien
 Pierre Arditi as a fisherman
 Samir Guesmi as the deliveryman

Accolades

References

External links 
 

2015 films
2015 comedy films
2010s French-language films
French comedy films
Films directed by Bruno Podalydès
2010s French films